"Nothing Hurts Like Love" is the lead single from New Zealand-British singer Daniel Bedingfield's second studio album, Second First Impression (2004). It peaked at number three on the UK Singles Chart and number seven on the Danish Singles Chart.

Track listings
UK CD single
 "Nothing Hurts Like Love"
 "A Kiss Without Commitment" (demo)
 "Nothing Hurts Like Love" (Poet's remix)

European CD single
 "Nothing Hurts Like Love"
 "A Kiss Without Commitment" (demo)

Personnel
Personnel are lifted from the UK CD single liner notes.

 Diane Warren – writing
 Daniel Bedingfield – vocals, co-production, design concept
 Eric Appapoulay – guitar
 The Fire Department – bass guitar, drums, programming
 Kenneth Crouch – piano
 Randy Curber – piano
 Luis Conte – percussion

 David Campbell – string arrangement
 Dean Nelson – additional engineering
 Dan Chase – additional engineering
 Tal Herzberg – additional engineering
 Jack Joseph Puig – production, mixing, engineering
 Stylorouge – design and art direction
 Sacha Waldman – photography

Charts

Weekly charts

Year-end charts

References

2004 singles
2004 songs
Daniel Bedingfield songs
Polydor Records singles
Song recordings produced by Jack Joseph Puig
Songs written by Diane Warren